Pierata (foaled 16 November 2014) is a Group 1 winning Australian thoroughbred racehorse.

Background
Pierata was sold for A$160,000 at the 2016 Magic Millions yearling sale.

Racing career
As a 3 year old Pierata won the Vo Rogue Plate at Doomben Racecourse.  Two weeks later he won the Magic Millions 3 year old Guineas and in doing so collected the largest prize money in the history of Queensland racing, A$ 1.2 million for first place as well as a $500,000 bonus for previous races won.

After 7 unsuccessful performances in Group 1 races, Pierata finally achieved Group 1 success in the 2019 All Aged Stakes at Royal Randwick Racecourse.

In the 2020 World's Best Racehorse Rankings, Pierata was rated on 118, making him the equal 80th best racehorse in the world.

Stud career
Pierata was retired from racing in 2020 and was acquired by Aquis Farm to stand at their stud in the Hunter Region for a service fee of A$44,000.

References 
 

Racehorses bred in Australia
2014 racehorse births